The non-marine molluscs of Honduras are a part of the molluscan wildlife of Honduras. A number of species of non-marine molluscs are found in the wild in Honduras.

There were no molluscs listed in the 2010 IUCN Red List of Threatened Species in Honduras, however, 4 species of freshwater snails and 2 species of freshwater bivalves were listed in the 2013 Red List.

Freshwater gastropods 

Ampullariidae
 Pomacea auriformis (Reeve, 1856)
 Pomacea flagellata dysoni (Hanley, 1854)

Pachychilidae
 Pachychilus oerstedi oerstedi Mörch, 1860 and Pachychilus oerstedi planensis (Lea, 1858)
 Pachychilus obeliscus obeliscus (Reeve, 1861)

Hydrobiidae
 Mesobia pristina Thompson & Hershler, 1991

Lymnaeidae
 Pseudosuccinea columella (Say, 1817) - introduced

Planorbidae
 Biomphalaria havanensis (Pfeiffer, 1839)

Physidae
 Mayabina obtusa Clessin, 1885

Land gastropods 

Helicinidae
 Helicina amoena Pfeiffer, 1849
 Helicina bocourti Crosse & Fischer, 1869
 Helicina sanguinea Pfeiffer, 1849
 Helicina flavida Menke, 1828
 Helicina diaphana Pfeiffer, 1852
 Helicina hondurana Richards, 1938
 Helicina rostrata denticulata Pfeiffer, 1955
 Helicina tenuis Pfeiffer, 1849
 Alcadia exigua (Pfeiffer, 1849)
 Lucidella lirata (Pfeiffer, 1847)
 Lucidella midyetti Richards, 1938
 Lucidella pilsbryi pilsbryi Clapp, 1914 and Lucidella pilsbryi indecora Pilsbry, 1930
 Pyrgodomus fischeri Pilsbry, 1930
 Pyrgodomus micordinus (Morelet, 1851) - probably
 Pyrgodomus simpsoni (Ancey, 1886)

Neocyclotidae
 Neocyclotus dysoni dysoni (Pfeiffer, 1851) and Neocyclotus dysoni dyeri (Bartsch & Morrison, 1942) and Neocyclotus dysoni ruatanensus (Bartsch & Morrison, 1942)
 Amphicyclotus texturatus goldfussi (Boettger, 1892)

Pomatiidae
 Chondropoma rubicundum (Morelet, 1849)
 Choanopoma andrewsae (Ancey, 1886)
 Chondropoma turritum Pfeiffer, 1853 - doubtful
 Cistula pleurophorum (Pfeiffer, 1852) - doubtful

Subulinidae
 Beckianum beckianum (L. Pfeiffer, 1846)

Spiraxidae
 Streptostyla sp.

Bivalvia

Sphaeriidae
 Eupera cubensis Prime, 1865

Mycetopodidae
 Anodontites trigonus'' Spix & Wagner, 1827

See also
Lists of molluscs of surrounding countries:
 List of non-marine molluscs of Guatemala
 List of non-marine molluscs of Nicaragua

References

Honduras
Molluscs
Honduras
Honduras
Honduras